Jenni Falconer (born 12 February 1976) is a Scottish radio and television presenter.  She appears on the ITV daytime show This Morning as a regular travel reporter and was a regular presenter of the National Lottery Draws on BBC One.

She was a radio presenter on Heart FM, presenting Heart Early Breakfast on weekdays from 4am to 6:30am and Sunday Breakfast from 6am to 9am. She stepped down from Sunday Breakfast in June 2019 after Early Weekday Breakfast was extended from 4-6am to 4–6.30am (an extra 30 minutes) due to changes of scheduling and presenting at Heart Breakfast. In December 2019, it was announced that Jenni Falconer would leave the show after the new year. She presented her final show on Friday 20 December 2019. In January 2020, it was announced that Falconer would be the new host for Smooth London breakfast & hosting on Saturday mid-mornings.

Early life
Falconer spent her formative years in Bishopbriggs and Milngavie, two towns on the outskirts of Glasgow. After her family relocated to the South of England when she was seven, she was educated at the independent Abbey School and attended the University of Leeds in 1994 to study Spanish and Italian with minors in Latin, Geography and Management Studies. Whilst studying at university, she also launched her television career. She was offered a contract by ITV to make a documentary and a consumer show on the proviso that she left her studies.

Career

Television
Falconer made her television debut in 1994 as a contestant on Blind Date, and later presented BBC Scotland's Big Country,  ITV's documentary series 3D and consumer show We Can Work It Out alongside Judy Finnigan and Jane Harvey. She hosted travel shows, Holiday and How to Holiday. She was the main co-host of Entertainment Today from its launch in 2000 until its end in July 2008 on GMTV.

Falconer's other work includes reporting on I'm a Celebrity... Get Me Out of Here! in Australia for GMTV in  2003, 2004 and 2006, hosting  The National Lottery Draws in September 2006 and hosting Cirque de Celebrité in October 2007. She also worked on a show about 24 for Sky1 24 in 24 which she suggested in the first place so she could meet Kiefer Sutherland.

In 2006, Falconer won the Sport Relief showjumping competition Only Fools on Horses riding an 8-year old 16 hands mare called J-Lo.

She hosted three series of Fantasy Homes By the Sea, which was broadcast around the world.

In 2009, Falconer was the host of the  daytime quiz show Wordplay on Channel 5 (previously called Brainteaser).

Between 17 and 21 August 2009, Falconer was a guest presenter on STV's  The Hour, with main anchor Stephen Jardine.

Falconer currently works as a travel reporter for This Morning. She also guest presented the show during Holly Willoughby's maternity leave from May to July 2011, sharing duties with Ruth Langsford and returned in 2013.

In January 2013, Falconer participated in the first series of the ITV's diving show Splash!, but was voted off by the judges. In August 2015, Falconer guest presented five episodes of Lorraine, standing in for regular host Lorraine Kelly.

Radio
On 14 March 2013, Global Radio announced that Falconer would join Heart to host the Sunday morning show from 6am to 8am, replacing Jason Donovan who took a break from the network to tour in the musical Priscilla: Queen of the Desert. She has since also presented the 46am Early Breakfast slot during the weekdays, known as 4 O'Clock Club.

Later, her Sunday show was expanded by an hour, now finishing at 9am.

In June 2019, her early breakfast show was extended 4–6:30am due to Heart Breakfast (usually 6am-10am) becoming national with the new Scheduled of 6.30am-10am. As a result, she decided to step down from her Sunday show. Zoe Hardman replaced Jenni on the Sunday Show.

In December 2019, It was announced that Falconer had decided to leave Heart and would be replaced on her Early Breakfast slot by James Stewart. In January 2020, it was announced that Falconer would be the new host for Smooth London breakfast & hosting on Saturday mid-mornings, the latter being broadcast across the UK.

Other work
In June 2009, Falconer was unveiled as the face and body of Adore Moi underwear range by Ultimo.

Falconer has also posed for photographs in Arena Magazine and FHM. In 2016, she starred in the Very television advertisements.

In March 2019 Falconer, a dedicated runner, announced the launch of her new podcast, RunPod, in which she meets celebrities and former sports stars who also love running for pleasure.

In July 2020 Falconer became the new running coach in the Start 2 Run app, guiding and motivating others to start and keep on running.

Personal life
Falconer married James Midgley at Babington House in June 2010. She gave birth to a daughter, Ella, in September 2011.

Since 2002, Falconer has been a celebrity patron of the charity Breast Cancer 2000. In 2012, Falconer took part in the London Marathon, raising money for CLIC Sargent. She finished with a time of 3 hours and 53 minutes. In the following two years, Falconer took part in the London Marathon, where she raised money for The Children's Trust the UK's leading charity for children with brain injury and neurodisability. In 2014, she completed the marathon in 3 hours and 57 minutes.
Falconer took part in the 2015 London Marathon, raising money for Cancer Research UK. In January 2019 Falconer became an Ambassador of The Children's Trust, having been a supporter since 2009. She has run three marathons for the charity in 2009, 2014 and 2019 and hosted gala fundraising events in London.

Filmography
Television

Guest appearances

Blind Date (1994) 
Never Mind the Buzzcocks (2001, 2006) 
Celebrities Under Pressure (2004) 
The Paul O'Grady Show (2005, 2007)
Hider in the House (2007)
All Star Family Fortunes (2007) 
School's Out (2007) 
Alan Carr's Celebrity Ding Dong (2008) 
Daily Cooks Challenge (2008)
All Star Mr & Mrs (2010) 
Countdown (2010)
Ten Mile Menu (2010)
The Cube Celebrity Special (2010) 
Live with Gabby (2012)
What's Cooking? (2013) 
The Chase: Celebrity Special (2013) 
Sport Relief's Top Dog (2014)
Tipping Point: Lucky Stars (2014) 
Celebrity Antiques Road Trip (2016)
Pointless Celebrities (2016)
The Saturday Show (2016)
Celebrity Ninja Warrior (2017/2018)
James Martin's Saturday Morning (2021)
The Chase Celebrity Christmas Special (2021)
The Weakest Link (2022)

References

External links
 Official Website
 Smooth Breakfast on Smooth Radio
 Jenni Falconer on Smooth Radio
 

1976 births
Living people
Alumni of the University of Leeds
Scottish television presenters
Scottish women television presenters
Scottish radio presenters
Scottish women radio presenters
GMTV presenters and reporters
Reality show winners
Mass media people from Glasgow
People educated at The Abbey School
Heart (radio network)